Ilavarasan is a 1992 Indian Tamil-language drama film directed by Senthilnathan. The film stars R. Sarathkumar and Sukanya. It was released on 15 January 1992.

Plot

Mirasu (Senthilnathan) killed his elder brother Selvanayagam (Nizhalgal Ravi) and Selvanayagam's wife (C. R. Saraswathi), he tried to kill his mistress Lakshmi (Kavitha) for the inheritance. The innocent Lakshmi was then sent in jail for Selvanayagam's murder and gave birth in jail, with the help of a police officer, she escaped from jail with her son Vijay.

Many years later, Mirasu spreads terror among the villagers and rapes the village girls, his son follows his path. Poongodu (Sukanya) and her family try to flee the village but Mirasu's henchmen intervene and Vijay (Sarath Kumar) saves them. Vijay, who comes from another village, introduces himself as an orphan. Poongodu falls in love with Vijay and he marries her. Finally, Vijay clashes with Mirasu. What transpires later forms the crux of the story.

Cast

R. Sarathkumar as Ilavarasan (Vijay)
Sukanya as Poongodu
Goundamani
Kavitha as Lakshmi
Senthilnathan as Mirasu
Senthamarai
Vennira Aadai Moorthy as Kanakku
Nizhalgal Ravi as Selvanayagam
C. R. Saraswathi as Selvanayagam's wife
Vadivelu
Swamikannu
Bayilvan Ranganathan
Ashwani Kumar
Paal
M. Rajkumar
Kokila as Kannatta
Babitha
V. R. Thilakam
Vasantha
Sharmili
Vasanthi
Suseela Patti
Baby Pushpa
V. Thamilazhagan

Soundtrack
The music was composed by Deva, with lyrics written by Muthulingam, Na. Kamarasan, Piraisoodan and Kadhalmathi.

References

External links

 

1992 films
Films scored by Deva (composer)
1990s Tamil-language films
Films directed by Senthilnathan